Liu Haocun (born ) is a Chinese actress. She made her acting debut in the drama film One Second (2020), and has since gone on to appear in various film titles.

Early life
Liu was born in Tonghua, Jilin Province. She studied in the middle school attached to the Beijing Dance Academy. In May 2016, she was admitted to the Beijing Dance Academy, where she received first place in the art test at the Folk Dance Department.

Career
During her sophomore year, she officially signed a contract with Zhang Yimou Studio. In , she passed three rounds of auditions and was cast as a heroine in Zhang's 2020 movie One Second, and then entered the preparatory group to start acting training. At first, Zhang had the idea of ​​casting her in his 2018 movie Shadow, but due to the adjustment of the script, she was not cast. In , she played the role of an optimistic girl suffering from cancer in the movie A Little Red Flower (2020). She won accolades for her performance in One Second and A Little Red Flower.

On , she won the 2020 Baidu Entertainment Best New Film Award. In February 2021, she participated in the Spring Festival Gala, where she sang songs 'Send the Night' and 'You are a Little Red Flower'. On the same month, she won the 2020 China Screen Billboard Annual Newcomer Actor Award sponsored by the film magazine China Screen.

In July 2021, Liu Haocun became the brand ambassador of Louis Vuitton. In October 2021, she won the Asian Film Award for Best Newcomer 
and the Best Young Actress Award in the New Generation Unit (Film Category) at the 8th WenRong TV Awards for her role of in the movie One Second. On the same year, she starred in Zhang Yimou's historical spy thriller film Cliff Walkers, which set in the Imperial Japanese puppet state of Manchukuo in the 1930s before the eruption of World War II.

On 2021, Liu was cast alongside Jackie Chan in the movie Ride On. In February 2022, she starred in the romantic-action movie Only Fools Rush In alongside Liu Haoran, which was directed by Han Han.

Personal life
In , Liu donated  for the victims of 2021 Henan floods.

On , according to media reports, Liu's mother once opened a dance agency, and a six-year-old girl was paralyzed due to an accident while engaging in a dance practice in 2012. The girl was sent to hospitals in Beijing for treatment and was later discharged. However, Liu's parents refused to pay the compensation and appealed the court's decision. As a result of the incident, Liu became a target of online hate. From 2012 to 2018, Liu's parents decided not to pay the compensation in accordance with the court's judgment for various reasons, and as a result appealed the ruling multiple times. However all appeals failed and the court did not change its judgment. The ruling was enforced in 2018 when Liu was preparing for her film debut.

Other than Louis Vuitton, Liu has won endorsements from brands such as L'Oreal, ZTE, Oreo and Cartier.

Filmography

Film

Notes

References

External links
 
  

21st-century Chinese actresses
Actresses from Jilin
Beijing Dance Academy alumni
Chinese film actresses
Living people
People from Tonghua
1998 births
Age controversies